Redmond John Barry (14 September 1866 – 11 July 1913) was an Irish lawyer and judge who became Lord Chancellor of Ireland; his promising career was cut short by his early death.

Biography 
He was the third son of Patrick Barry of Hill View, Cork. He was educated at the Royal University of Ireland, was called to the Bar in 1888 and became Queen's Counsel in 1899. He was not related to the statesman John Redmond, although as he cheerfully admitted, the widespread belief that he was Redmond's kinsman did no harm to his career. He married Ethel Pyke of Southport in 1895.

Barry was appointed Solicitor-General for Ireland in the Liberal government of 1905, and on 6 March 1907 he was elected in a by-election as Member of Parliament for North Tyrone. He was promoted to Attorney-General for Ireland in 1909 then raised to the bench as Lord Chancellor of Ireland in 1911, serving until his death at age 46. His professional skill is shown by the detailed answers he gave to the House of Commons in 1910, which show both the width of the problems he had to deal with and his efficiency in solving them.

Maurice Healy in his memoir The Old Munster Circuit praises Barry warmly as a gifted and cultivated lawyer, who left behind him more affectionate memories than any other member of the Irish Bar.

His son, Sir Patrick Barry, became an English High Court judge.

Arms

References

External links
 http://hansard.millbanksystems.com/people/mr-redmond-barry
 

1866 births
1913 deaths
Solicitors-General for Ireland
Attorneys-General for Ireland
Lord chancellors of Ireland
Irish Liberal Party MPs
Members of the Privy Council of Ireland
People from Cork (city)
Members of the Parliament of the United Kingdom for County Tyrone constituencies (1801–1922)
UK MPs 1906–1910
UK MPs 1910
UK MPs 1910–1918